Vanua Vatu is an island in Fiji. It is located in the Eastern Division, in the western part of the country, 240 km west of the capital Suva. The area is 4.2 square kilometers.

References

Lau Islands
Islands of Fiji